

Belgium
Belgian Congo – Pierre Ryckmans, Governor-General of the Belgian Congo (1934–1946)

France
 French Somaliland – 
 Michel Raphael Antoine Saller, Governor of French Somaliland (1943–1944)
 Jean Victor Louis Joseph Chalvet, Governor of French Somaliland (1944–1946)
 Guinea – 
 Horace Valentin Crocicchia, Governor of Guinea (1942–1944)
 Jacques Georges Fourneau, acting Governor of Guinea (1944–1946)

Japan
 Karafuto – Toshio Otsu, Governor-General of Karafuto (1 July 1943 – 11 November 1947)
 Korea – 
Kuniaki Koiso, Governor-General of Korea (1942–1944)
Nobuyuki Abe, Governor-General of Korea (1944–1945)
 Taiwan – 
Kiyoshi Hasegawa, Governor-General of Taiwan (16 December 1940 – December 1944)
Rikichi Ando, Governor-General of Taiwan (December 1944 – October 1945)

Portugal
 Angola – Vasco Lopes Alves, High Commissioner of Angola (1943–1947)

United Kingdom
 Aden – Sir John Hathorn Hall, Governor of Aden (1940–1945)
 Malta Colony
Lord Gort, Governor of Malta (1942–1944)
Edmond Schreiber, Governor of Malta (1944–1946)
 Northern Rhodesia – Sir Eubule John Waddington, Governor of Northern Rhodesia (1941–1947)

Colonial governors
Colonial governors
1944